Zelotes puritanus is a species of ground spider in the family Gnaphosidae. It is found in North America, Europe, Turkey, and a range from Russia to Kazakhstan.

References

Gnaphosidae
Articles created by Qbugbot
Spiders described in 1922